Euan Campbell (born 24 September 1945) is a former Australian rules footballer who played with Melbourne in the Victorian Football League (VFL).

Notes

External links 

1945 births
Living people
Australian rules footballers from Victoria (Australia)
Melbourne Football Club players
Old Scotch Football Club players